Sir Stanley Ernest Bailey  (30 September 1926 – 9 August 2008) was a senior British police officer. He was chief constable of Northumbria Police from 1975 until 1991.

Bailey was born in Somers Town, London, and during World War II was conscripted to work in the coal mining industry as a Bevin Boy. In 1947 he began his career with the Metropolitan Police.

The hunt for the Cannock Chase murderer was led by Bailey, Staffordshire's assistant chief constable at the time.

Honours

See also
Donald Neilson

References

http://news.bbc.co.uk/1/hi/england/7553571.stm
http://www.morpethherald.co.uk/news/Sir-Stanley-Bailey-dies-at.4375531.jp

External links
Obituary in The Times
Obituary in The Telegraph
Obituary in The Independent

1926 births
2008 deaths
British Chief Constables
Knights Bachelor
Commanders of the Order of the British Empire
English recipients of the Queen's Police Medal
People from Somers Town, London
Bevin Boys
Metropolitan Police officers